The 34th Street station was a local station on the demolished IRT Second Avenue Line in Manhattan, New York City. It had two levels. The upper level had three tracks and two side platforms and was used for the Second Avenue line trains. The lower level, also known as the Second Avenue station, had two tracks and one island platform and was used by 34th Street shuttle trains. The next stop to the north was 42nd Street. The next stop to the south was 23rd Street. The next eastbound stop on the shuttle was 34th Street Ferry. The next westbound stop on the shuttle was Third Avenue. The shuttle platform closed on July 14, 1930, and the main line station closed on June 13, 1942.

References

External links

http://www.nycsubway.org/perl/caption.pl?/img/maps/calcagno-1920-elevated.gif

IRT Second Avenue Line stations
Railway stations closed in 1942
Former elevated and subway stations in Manhattan
34th Street (Manhattan)